Mary Pruitt (February 3, 1934 – September 19, 2020) was an American politician and Tennessee State Representative from Nashville, representing the 58th district from 1985 to 2013.

Biography
Pruitt was born in Brentwood, Tennessee in 1934. A member of the Tennessee House of Representatives since 1985, Pruitt was originally elected in a special election upon the death of her husband, Charles Pruitt, who had previously held the position.

Pruitt is a National Honorary member of Sigma Gamma Rho, member of the Order of Eastern Star, 100 Black Women of Middle TN, a State Fair Board Commissioner, and a member of the Meharry Medical College Board of Trustees. She has a B.S. and M.ED. from Tennessee State University and matriculated, but did not graduate from, the University of Northern Colorado.

"She really was an advocate for education," U.S. representative for Nashville Harold Love Jr. said of Pruitt. Pruitt, a retired teacher with both an undergraduate and graduate degree from Tennessee State University, "realized the importance of that [education]." "She knew that if kids were given the opportunity to have a good learning environment, then of course the world was theirs."

She died after a fall on September 19, 2020, at the age of 86.

Investigations
Pruitt was the subject of several investigations focusing on inappropriate or illegal use of funds. In 2006, it was discovered that she was renting a campaign office from herself, but the building was not used, and for some time, did not have utilities. Rep. Pruitt denied the charges, charging entrapment, but was fined $10,000 for failing to appear before the Registry of Election Finance (later reversed). Pruitt's attorney argued that utilities were routinely disconnected to discourage vandalism.

Investigations of public records also found several potential conflicts of interest. A scholarship fund which Pruitt directed awarded a scholarship to her relative. A legislative earmark Pruitt requested awarded $55,000 to a corporation she founded. Pruitt requested and received a per diem allowance for travel and lodging, despite living two miles from her office.

References

External links
Mary Pruitt's profile at the Tennessee General Assembly website

1934 births
2020 deaths
African-American state legislators in Tennessee
African-American women in politics
Democratic Party members of the Tennessee House of Representatives
People from Brentwood, Tennessee
Politicians from Nashville, Tennessee
Women state legislators in Tennessee
Tennessee State University alumni
University of Northern Colorado alumni
20th-century American politicians
20th-century American women politicians
21st-century American politicians
21st-century American women politicians
20th-century African-American women
20th-century African-American politicians
21st-century African-American women
21st-century African-American politicians